The Sugo Inter 500 km, was the fifth round of both the 1991 All Japan Sports Prototype Championship and the 1991 Long Distance Series, held at the Sugo on 15 September, in front of a crowd of approximately 45,000.

Report

Entry
A total of 14 cars were entered for the event, in two classes, one for cars running to Group C1 specification and the other to IMSA GTP regulations.

Qualifying
The Nisseki Racing Team of George Fouché and Steven Andskär took pole position, in their Porsche 962GTi ahead of the Toyota Team SARD’s Toyota 91C-V of Roland Ratzenberger and Pierre-Henri Raphanel, by only 0.047secs.

Race
The race was held over 135 laps of the Sportsland Sugo circuit, a distance of 500 km (actual distance was 500.075 km). Eje Elgh and Geoff Lees took the winner spoils for the Toyota Team Tom’s, driving their Toyota 91C-V. The European duo won in a time of 2hr 57:30.838mins., averaging a speed of 105.641 mph. Second place went to Akihiko Nakaya and Volker Weidler in the From A Racing’s Nissan R91CK who finished about 6.5 seconds adrift. Also on the lead lap, in third place was the Nissan Motorsport of Anders Olofsson and Masahiro Hasemi.

Classification

Result

Class Winners are in Bold text.

 Fastest lap: Masanori Sekiya/Hitoshi Ogawa, 1:14.593secs. (111.74 mph)

References

All Japan Sports Prototype Championship
Fuji Long Distance Series
SUGO Inter 500km
Sugo